The 1984–85 NBA season was the Spurs' ninth season in the NBA, the 12th in San Antonio, and the 18th season as a franchise. This would be George Gervin's last season with the team before getting traded to the Chicago Bulls following the season. It was also Alvin Robertson's NBA debut.

Draft picks

Roster

Regular season

Season standings

z - clinched division title
y - clinched division title
x - clinched playoff spot

Record vs. opponents

Game log

Regular season

|- align="center" bgcolor="#ccffcc"
| 1
| October 27, 19847:30p.m. CDT
| L.A. Lakers
| W 113–112
| Gervin (32)
| Gilmore (21)
| Moore (8)
| HemisFair Arena13,506
| 1–0
|- align="center" bgcolor="#ccffcc"
| 2
| October 30, 1984
| Denver
| W 126–118
|
|
|
| HemisFair Arena
| 2–0

|- align="center" bgcolor="#ccffcc"
| 3
| November 1, 1984
| @ Golden State
| W 123–108
|
|
|
| Oakland-Alameda County Coliseum Arena
| 3–0
|- align="center" bgcolor="#ffcccc"
| 4
| November 2, 19849:30p.m. CST
| @ L.A. Lakers
| L 100–119
| Mitchell (20)
| Robertson (7)
| Moore (8)
| The Forum13,550
| 3–1
|- align="center" bgcolor="#ccffcc"
| 5
| November 4, 1984
| New York
| W 131–130 (2OT)
|
|
|
| HemisFair Arena
| 4–1
|- align="center" bgcolor="#ccffcc"
| 6
| November 6, 1984
| Seattle
| W 99–91
|
|
|
| HemisFair Arena
| 5–1
|- align="center" bgcolor="#ffcccc"
| 7
| November 7, 1984
| @ Utah
| L 124–136
|
|
|
| Salt Palace Acord Arena
| 5–2
|- align="center" bgcolor="#ccffcc"
| 8
| November 10, 1984
| Cleveland
| W 127–103
|
|
|
| HemisFair Arena
| 6–2
|- align="center" bgcolor="#ffcccc"
| 9
| November 13, 1984
| @ Chicago
| L 117–120
|
|
|
| Chicago Stadium
| 6–3
|- align="center" bgcolor="#ffcccc"
| 10
| November 14, 1984
| @ Washington
| L 106–125
|
|
|
| Capital Centre
| 6–4
|- align="center" bgcolor="#ffcccc"
| 11
| November 16, 1984
| @ Indiana
| L 117–128 (OT)
|
|
|
| Market Square Arena
| 6–5
|- align="center" bgcolor="#ffcccc"
| 12
| November 17, 1984
| @ Houston
| L 133–141
|
|
|
| The Summit
| 6–6
|- align="center" bgcolor="#ffcccc"
| 13
| November 21, 1984
| Detroit
| L 101–114
|
|
|
| HemisFair Arena
| 6–7
|- align="center" bgcolor="#ffcccc"
| 14
| November 24, 1984
| Utah
| L 117–123
|
|
|
| HemisFair Arena
| 6–8
|- align="center" bgcolor="#ffcccc"
| 15
| November 27, 1984
| Houston
| L 97–114
|
|
|
| HemisFair Arena
| 6–9
|- align="center" bgcolor="#ccffcc"
| 16
| November 29, 1984
| Dallas
| W 124–116
|
|
|
| HemisFair Arena
| 7–9

|- align="center" bgcolor="#ccffcc"
| 17
| December 1, 1984
| L.A. Clippers
| W 142–110
|
|
|
| HemisFair Arena
| 8–9
|- align="center" bgcolor="#ccffcc"
| 18
| December 4, 1984
| Atlanta
| W 114–106
|
|
|
| HemisFair Arena
| 9–9
|- align="center" bgcolor="#ffcccc"
| 19
| December 6, 1984
| @ Portland
| L 96–113
|
|
|
| Memorial Coliseum
| 9–10
|- align="center" bgcolor="#ccffcc"
| 20
| December 7, 1984
| @ Seattle
| W 117–114
|
|
|
| Kingdome
| 10–10
|- align="center" bgcolor="#ffcccc"
| 21
| December 9, 1984
| @ L.A. Clippers
| L 123–126
|
|
|
| Los Angeles Memorial Sports Arena
| 10–11
|- align="center" bgcolor="#ffcccc"
| 22
| December 11, 1984
| @ Kansas City
| L 120–121
|
|
|
| Kemper Arena
| 10–12
|- align="center" bgcolor="#ccffcc"
| 23
| December 12, 1984
| Denver
| W 126–105
|
|
|
| HemisFair Arena
| 11–12
|- align="center" bgcolor="#ffcccc"
| 24
| December 14, 1984
| @ Dallas
| L 102–119
|
|
|
| Reunion Arena
| 11–13
|- align="center" bgcolor="#ccffcc"
| 25
| December 15, 1984
| Phoenix
| W 120–111
|
|
|
| HemisFair Arena
| 12–13
|- align="center" bgcolor="#ffcccc"
| 26
| December 18, 1984
| @ Cleveland
| L 110–118
|
|
|
| Richfield Coliseum
| 12–14
|- align="center" bgcolor="#ffcccc"
| 27
| December 19, 1984
| @ Philadelphia
| L 118–123
|
|
|
| The Spectrum
| 12–15
|- align="center" bgcolor="#ccffcc"
| 28
| December 21, 1984
| @ New Jersey
| W 122–116
|
|
|
| Brendan Byrne Arena
| 13–15
|- align="center" bgcolor="#ffcccc"
| 29
| December 22, 1984
| @ Milwaukee
| L 90–101
|
|
|
| MECCA Arena
| 13–16
|- align="center" bgcolor="#ffcccc"
| 30
| December 26, 1984
| @ Denver
| L 119–130
|
|
|
| McNichols Sports Arena
| 13–17
|- align="center" bgcolor="#ccffcc"
| 31
| December 27, 1984
| Portland
| W 141–120
|
|
|
| HemisFair Arena
| 14–17
|- align="center" bgcolor="#ffcccc"
| 32
| December 29, 1984
| Boston
| L 112–120
|
|
|
| HemisFair Arena
| 14–18

|- align="center" bgcolor="#ccffcc"
| 33
| January 3, 1985
| Dallas
| W 116–115
|
|
|
| HemisFair Arena
| 15–18
|- align="center" bgcolor="#ffcccc"
| 34
| January 6, 19859:30p.m. CST
| @ L.A. Lakers
| L 98–99
| Moore (27)
| Gilmore, Iavaroni (8)
| Moore (6)
| The Forum13,513
| 15–19
|- align="center" bgcolor="#ccffcc"
| 35
| January 8, 1985
| Golden State
| W 139–94
|
|
|
| HemisFair Arena
| 16–19
|- align="center" bgcolor="#ffcccc"
| 36
| January 11, 1985
| Portland
| L 103–123
|
|
|
| HemisFair Arena
| 16–20
|- align="center" bgcolor="#ccffcc"
| 37
| January 15, 1985
| Utah
| W 121–101
|
|
|
| HemisFair Arena
| 17–20
|- align="center" bgcolor="#ccffcc"
| 38
| January 17, 1985
| @ Kansas City
| W 117–113
|
|
|
| Kemper Arena
| 18–20
|- align="center" bgcolor="#ccffcc"
| 39
| January 19, 1985
| Phoenix
| W 106–100
|
|
|
| HemisFair Arena
| 19–20
|- align="center" bgcolor="#ccffcc"
| 40
| January 22, 1985
| Kansas City
| W 117–113
|
|
|
| HemisFair Arena
| 20–20
|- align="center" bgcolor="#ffcccc"
| 41
| January 23, 1985
| @ Dallas
| L 110–122
|
|
|
| Reunion Arena
| 20–21
|- align="center" bgcolor="#ccffcc"
| 42
| January 25, 1985
| @ Houston
| W 122–107
|
|
|
| The Summit
| 21–21
|- align="center" bgcolor="#ffcccc"
| 43
| January 27, 1985
| Milwaukee
| L 93–106
|
|
|
| HemisFair Arena
| 21–22
|- align="center" bgcolor="#ccffcc"
| 44
| January 29, 1985
| New Jersey
| W 130–127
|
|
|
| HemisFair Arena
| 22–22
|- align="center" bgcolor="#ffcccc"
| 45
| January 31, 1985
| @ Seattle
| L 94–96
|
|
|
| Kingdome
| 22–23

|- align="center" bgcolor="#ccffcc"
| 46
| February 1, 1985
| @ Portland
| W 104–93
|
|
|
| Memorial Coliseum
| 23–23
|- align="center" bgcolor="#ffcccc"
| 47
| February 2, 1985
| @ Utah
| L 104–105
|
|
|
| Salt Palace Acord Arena
| 23–24
|- align="center" bgcolor="#ccffcc"
| 48
| February 4, 1985
| Golden State
| W 114–109 (OT)
|
|
|
| HemisFair Arena
| 24–24
|- align="center" bgcolor="#ffcccc"
| 49
| February 5, 1985
| @ Kansas City
| L 116–135
|
|
|
| Kemper Arena
| 24–25
|- align="center" bgcolor="#ccffcc"
| 50
| February 7, 1985
| L.A. Clippers
| W 120–108
|
|
|
| HemisFair Arena
| 25–25
|- align="center"
|colspan="9" bgcolor="#bbcaff"|All-Star Break
|- style="background:#cfc;"
|- bgcolor="#bbffbb"
|- align="center" bgcolor="#ccffcc"
| 51
| February 12, 1985
| Kansas City
| W 127–109
|
|
|
| HemisFair Arena
| 26–25
|- align="center" bgcolor="#ccffcc"
| 52
| February 14, 1985
| Phoenix
| W 131–102
|
|
|
| HemisFair Arena
| 27–25
|- align="center" bgcolor="#ffcccc"
| 53
| February 15, 1985
| @ Denver
| L 119–129
|
|
|
| McNichols Sports Arena
| 27–26
|- align="center" bgcolor="#ffcccc"
| 54
| February 18, 1985
| @ L.A. Clippers
| L 121–125
|
|
|
| Los Angeles Memorial Sports Arena
| 27–27
|- align="center" bgcolor="#ffcccc"
| 55
| February 20, 1985
| Washington
| L 104–105
|
|
|
| HemisFair Arena
| 27–28
|- align="center" bgcolor="#ccffcc"
| 56
| February 22, 1985
| @ Phoenix
| W 118–111
|
|
|
| Arizona Veterans Memorial Coliseum
| 28–28
|- align="center" bgcolor="#ffcccc"
| 57
| February 24, 1985
| Portland
| L 121–137
|
|
|
| HemisFair Arena
| 28–29
|- align="center" bgcolor="#ffcccc"
| 58
| February 26, 1985
| @ New York
| L 122–129
|
|
|
| Madison Square Garden
| 28–30
|- align="center" bgcolor="#ffcccc"
| 59
| February 27, 1985
| @ Boston
| L 102–111
|
|
|
| Boston Garden
| 28–31

|- align="center" bgcolor="#ccffcc"
| 60
| March 1, 1985
| @ Detroit
| W 108–98
|
|
|
| Pontiac Silverdome
| 29–31
|- align="center" bgcolor="#ccffcc"
| 61
| March 2, 1985
| @ Atlanta
| W 105–92
|
|
|
| The Omni
| 30–31
|- align="center" bgcolor="#ccffcc"
| 62
| March 4, 1985
| Philadelphia
| W 109–103
|
|
|
| HemisFair Arena
| 31–31
|- align="center" bgcolor="#ccffcc"
| 63
| March 6, 1985
| Indiana
| W 108–102
|
|
|
| HemisFair Arena
| 32–31
|- align="center" bgcolor="#ffcccc"
| 64
| March 7, 1985
| @ Phoenix
| L 117–119
|
|
|
| Arizona Veterans Memorial Coliseum
| 32–32
|- align="center" bgcolor="#ffcccc"
| 65
| March 9, 1985
| Houston
| L 117–123
|
|
|
| HemisFair Arena
| 32–33
|- align="center" bgcolor="#ffcccc"
| 66
| March 12, 1985
| @ Golden State
| L 122–145
|
|
|
| Oakland-Alameda County Coliseum Arena
| 32–34
|- align="center" bgcolor="#ccffcc"
| 67
| March 14, 1985
| @ Seattle
| W 100–93
|
|
|
| Kingdome
| 33–34
|- align="center" bgcolor="#ffcccc"
| 68
| March 15, 19859:30p.m. CST
| @ L.A. Lakers
| L 114–115
| Gervin (37)
| Banks (12)
| Moore (11)
| The Forum16,130
| 33–35
|- align="center" bgcolor="#ccffcc"
| 69
| March 17, 1985
| Denver
| W 124–119
|
|
|
| HemisFair Arena
| 34–35
|- align="center" bgcolor="#ffcccc"
| 70
| March 19, 1985
| @ Dallas
| L 89–96
|
|
|
| Reunion Arena
| 34–36
|- align="center" bgcolor="#ccffcc"
| 71
| March 20, 1985
| Chicago
| W 106–98
|
|
|
| HemisFair Arena
| 35–36
|- align="center" bgcolor="#ffcccc"
| 72
| March 22, 1985
| Dallas
| L 114–123
|
|
|
| HemisFair Arena
| 35–37
|- align="center" bgcolor="#ccffcc"
| 73
| March 24, 1985
| Seattle
| W 104–99
|
|
|
| HemisFair Arena
| 36–37
|- align="center" bgcolor="#ccffcc"
| 74
| March 27, 1985
| Golden State
| W 121–120
|
|
|
| HemisFair Arena
| 37–37
|- align="center" bgcolor="#ffcccc"
| 75
| March 29, 1985
| @ Utah
| L 109–114
|
|
|
| Salt Palace Acord Arena
| 37–38
|- align="center" bgcolor="#ccffcc"
| 76
| March 31, 1985
| @ L.A. Clippers
| W 126–115
|
|
|
| Los Angeles Memorial Sports Arena
| 38–38

|- align="center" bgcolor="#ccffcc"
| 77
| April 3, 19857:30p.m. CST
| L.A. Lakers
| W 122–108
| Mitchell (36)
| Mitchell (14)
| Moore (13)
| HemisFair Arena11,627
| 39–38
|- align="center" bgcolor="#ffcccc"
| 78
| April 5, 1985
| @ Denver
| L 109–118
|
|
|
| McNichols Sports Arena
| 39–39
|- align="center" bgcolor="#ccffcc"
| 79
| April 7, 1985
| Houston
| W 126–105
|
|
|
| HemisFair Arena
| 40–39
|- align="center" bgcolor="#ffcccc"
| 80
| April 9, 1985
| @ Houston
| L 103–124
|
|
|
| The Summit
| 40–40
|- align="center" bgcolor="#ccffcc"
| 81
| April 12, 1985
| Kansas City
| W 117–112
|
|
|
| HemisFair Arena
| 41–40
|- align="center" bgcolor="#ffcccc"
| 82
| April 14, 1985
| Utah
| L 102–104
|
|
|
| HemisFair Arena
| 41–41

Playoffs

|-
|- align="center" bgcolor="#ffcccc"
| 1
| April 18, 1985
| @ Denver
| L 111–141
| Mitchell (23)
| Jones (8)
| Moore (5)
| McNichols Sports Arena12,128
| 0–1
|- align="center" bgcolor="#ccffcc"
| 2
| April 20, 1985
| @ Denver
| W 113–111
| Gervin (41)
| Gilmore (12)
| Moore (8)
| McNichols Sports Arena17,022
| 1–1
|- align="center" bgcolor="#ffcccc"
| 3
| April 23, 1985
| Denver
| L 112–115
| Gervin (30)
| Gilmore (14)
| Moore (9)
| HemisFair Arena8,799
| 1–2
|- align="center" bgcolor="#ccffcc"
| 4
| April 26, 1985
| Denver
| W 116–111
| Mitchell (37)
| Gilmore (13)
| Moore (16)
| HemisFair Arena8,621
| 2–2
|- align="center" bgcolor="#ffcccc"
| 5
| April 28, 1985
| @ Denver
| L 99–126
| Gilmore (19)
| Gilmore, Iavaroni (8)
| Moore (4)
| McNichols Sports Arena17,022
| 2–3
|-

Player statistics

Season

Playoffs

Awards and records

Transactions

References

See also
1984-85 NBA season

San Antonio Spurs seasons
San
San Antonio
San Antonio